The Beach Volleyball Major Series (or Beach Major Series and formerly the Swatch Beach Volleyball Major Series) was an international series of beach volleyball tournaments from 2015 to 2020. The tournaments consisted of Tour Stops and formed part of the FIVB Beach Volleyball World Tour. The series concluded with the FIVB World Tour Finals.

Each tournament in the series had a prize pool of US$300,000 per gender, except for the World Tour Finals which had a prize pool of US$400,000 per gender.

History 
The Beach Volleyball Major Series arose out of a joint-venture between Austrian companies Red Bull and the ACTS Group.

Red Bull was established in 1987 by Dietrich Mateschitz. Aside from the energy drink, Red Bull's direct marketing focuses heavily on sports and lifestyle.

ACTS Group is a marketing agency founded in 1990 by Hannes Jagerhofer. It offers services including event-marketing, event-organization, external-communication and public relations. The group has also been responsible for the organizing beach volleyball tournaments, including the FIVB Grand Slams in Klagenfurt, Carinthia, Austria.

Swatch was the title sponsor of the Swatch Beach Volleyball Major Series between 2015 and 2017.

The Series will not continue because of the COVID-19 pandemic.

Relation to the FIVB 

The competition was overseen by the FIVB, the international governing body for the sports of indoor, beach and grass volleyball.

In the category of Beach Volleyball, the FIVB oversees three competitions, namely: the FIVB Beach Volleyball Continental Cup, the FIVB Beach Volleyball World Tour and lastly the FIVB Beach Volleyball World Championships.

The Beach Volleyball Major Series formed part of the FIVB Beach Volleyball World Tour.

Olympic qualification

Beach volleyball was formally recognized as an Olympic discipline in 1996. In order for a beach volleyball athlete to participate in the Olympics, minimum requirements must be met and one of these requirements as stipulated by the FIVB is that all athletes must have participated in a minimum of 12 official FIVB Olympic qualification tournaments as an individual.

Also an athlete hoping to participate in the Olympics must earn FIVB World Ranking points which tallies up to make up the Olympic Ranking.

Participation in Major Series tournaments counts towards Olympic qualification tournaments and also earns athletes FIVB World Ranking points. An exception is the FIVB World Tour Finals – participating teams do not earn FIVB World Ranking points for this event.

In 2016, the smart Major Hamburg was the final tournament where Olympic ranking points for the 2016 Olympic Games in Rio de Janeiro could be obtained.

Tournaments

2015 

The first Beach Volleyball Major Series began in 2015. There were Tour Stops in Poreč, Croatia; Stavanger, Norway and Gstaad, Switzerland. The Swatch Beach Volleyball FIVB World Tour Finals took place in Fort Lauderdale Florida, United States.

2016 

The 2016 Major Series schedule began in Hamburg, Germany, and took in further stops in Croatia, Switzerland and Klagenfurt in Austria. The Series culminated with the Swatch Beach Volleyball FIVB World Tour Finals in Toronto.

2017 

The 2017 Major Series schedule was released in October 2016. As part of the FIVB World Tour, the Swatch Major Series did include trips to Poreč and Gstaad. The 2017 tour began in February in Fort Lauderdale, the site of the 2015 World Tour Finals. The 2017 Finals were held in August in Hamburg. The Swatch Major Series was also responsible for the organization of the FIVB Beach Volleyball World Championships in Vienna in July and August.

2018

2019

2020 
Due to the COVID-19 pandemic, all three tournaments as well as the whole Beach Volleyball Major Series have been cancelled .

Mascot 

The Major Series' official mascot was Marnin. Unveiled prior to the 2016 season, Marnin is described as a cross between a kangaroo and a fox. Marnin made his debut courtside on the FIVB Tour at the Hamburg Major.

See also
Hannes Jagerhofer
Red Bull
FIVB
Beach volleyball

References

External links 
 Official website

Beach volleyball competitions
Sports competition series
Red Bull